Ahead of the 1936 elections to the French National Assembly, a Popular Front committee was formed in Senegal. It consisted of the local branch of French Section of the Workers' International (SFIO), the Senegalese Socialist Party, the local Communist cell, the Human Rights League, and the local branch of the Radical and Radical Socialist Party led by François Carpot. The committee supported the candidature of Lamine Guèye.

See also 
 Popular Front (France)

1936 establishments in French West Africa
Defunct left-wing political party alliances
Defunct political parties in Senegal
Defunct political party alliances in Africa
Defunct socialist parties
French West Africa
Political parties established in 1936
Political party alliances in Senegal
Popular fronts
Socialist parties in Senegal